Round-robin is a document signed by multiple parties in a circle to make it more difficult to determine the order in which it was signed, thus preventing a ringleader from being identified.

Origin

The term dates from the 17th-century French Rond ruban (round ribbon). This described the practice of signatories to petitions against authority (usually Government officials petitioning the Crown) appending their names on a document in a non-hierarchical circle or ribbon pattern (and so disguising the order in which they have signed) so that none may be identified as a ringleader.

This practice was adopted by sailors petitioning officers in the Royal Navy (first recorded 1731).

Spanish–American War

A round-robin letter was authored in Cuba after the cessation of hostilities in 1898 by a committee of 10 brigade commanders of the American Army's V Corps including acting brigade commander Theodore Roosevelt during the Spanish–American War, to accelerate the departure of the American Army back to the United States during the rainy disease-plagued summer season. This letter was leaked to the press and embarrassed the administration of US President William McKinley.

References

Military terminology
Documents